Possession is a 1919 British silent romance film directed by Henry Edwards and starring Edwards, Chrissie White and Gerald Ames. It is an adaptation of the 1897 novel Phroso: A Romance by Anthony Hope.

Cast
 Henry Edwards - Blaise Barewsky 
 Chrissie White - Valerie Sarton 
 Gerald Ames - Richard Staire 
 Gwynne Herbert - Tante 
 Stephen Ewart - John Sarton 
 Annie Esmond - Marquise 
 Bubbles Brown - Valerie, as a child

References

External links

1919 films
1910s romance films
British silent feature films
Films based on works by Anthony Hope
Films directed by Henry Edwards
Hepworth Pictures films
British black-and-white films
British romance films
1910s English-language films
1910s British films